John Brown is an American bodybuilder, who won Amateur Mr. Universe twice (1981, 1982) and Mr. World three times.

He was born and raised in West Sacramento, California. He is the father of NFL wide receivers Equanimeous and Amon-Ra St. Brown. His middle son, Osiris St. Brown, played NCAA Division I college football for the Stanford Cardinal.

References

Year of birth missing (living people)
Living people
People from Compton, California
American bodybuilders